Munroe may refer to:

People
 Munroe (surname) and a list of people with the name

Places
 Munroe Falls, Ohio, USA
 Munroe Lake, Manitoba, Canada
 Munroe Island, Kerala, India
 Munroe Island (Philippines), Philippines
 Munroe Tavern, Lexington, MA, USA
 Fort Munroe, Punjab, Pakistan.

Facilities and structures
Munroe (PAT station), Pittsburgh, PA, USA
Munroe (MBTA station), Lexington, MA, USA

Other uses
 Munroe effect, the partial focusing of blast energy caused by a hollow or void cut into a piece of explosive

See also

 Monro (disambiguation)
 Monroe (disambiguation)
 Munro (disambiguation)